This is a list of New Zealand television events and premieres which occurred, or are scheduled to occur, in 1997, the 37th year of continuous operation of television in New Zealand.

This is a list of New Zealand television-related events in 1997.

Events
1 January – Cartoon Network shifted from HBO to Orange running from 6am to 4pm daily. HBO extended its transmission hours and started playing 24 hours a day.
29 June – The fourth television channel TV4 launches.
11 August – TVNZ launches Breakfast with hosts Mike Hosking and Susan Wood.
CanWest takes full ownership of TV3.
American animated comedy series King of the Hill is transmitted on TV3.

Debuts

Domestic
March – McDonald's Young Entertainers (TV2) (1997–1999)
11 August – Breakfast (TV One) (1997–present)
1 October – Duggan (TV One) (1997–1999)
Treasure Island (TVNZ) (1997–present)

International
15 July –  The Story of Bean (TV One)
 Cow and Chicken (TV2)
 Full Circle with Michael Palin (TV One)
 Buffy the Vampire Slayer (TV3)
 Strange Universe (TV2)
 Nick Freno: Licensed Teacher (TV2)
 Bump in the Night (TV2)
 Hey Arnold! (TV2)
 Suddenly Susan (TV3)
 King of the Hill (TV3)
 Pandora's Clock (TV3)
 Sabrina the Teenage Witch (TV3)
 Monty the Dog (TV One)

Subscription television

Subscription premieres
This is a list of programs which made their premiere on New Zealand subscription television that had previously premiered on New Zealand free-to-air television. Programs may still air on the original free-to-air television network.

International

Changes to network affiliation
This is a list of programs which made their premiere on a New Zealand television network that had previously premiered on another New Zealand television network. The networks involved in the switch of allegiances are predominantly both free-to-air networks or both subscription television networks. Programs that have their free-to-air/subscription television premiere, after previously premiering on the opposite platform (free-to air to subscription/subscription to free-to air) are not included. In some cases, programs may still air on the original television network. This occurs predominantly with programs shared between subscription television networks.

Domestic

International

New channels

Free for air
29 June – TV4

Cable
1 January – Cartoon Network

Television shows
What Now (1981–present)
Letter to Blanchy (1989, 1994–1997)
Shortland Street (1992–present)
You and Me (1993–1998)
Squirt (1996–2006)
City Life (1996–1998)
Breakfast (1997–present)
McDonald's Young Entertainers (1997–1999)

Ending this year
Letter to Blanchy (TV One/TV3) (1994–1997)